The Mang, or Matang, community is an Indian caste mainly residing in the state of Maharashtra. Matang are known as Madiga in Telangana,Andhra Pradesh and Karnataka. 

The community was historically believed to be associated with village security and professions such as rope making, broom making, musicians, cattle castration, leather curing, midwifery, executioners, and funeral directors. In modern day India, they are listed as a Scheduled Caste,
Their origins lie in the Narmada Valley of India, and they were formerly classified as a criminal tribe under the Criminal Tribes Acts of the British Raj.

Religion
The Mang practice Hinduism, Buddhism and worship the deities Rama, Krishna Bhagavan, and Hanuman. Bhavani Janakamma is the caste deity of the Mang.In modern times, they are ardent followers of  Dr.Babasaheb Ambedkar, and many of them have converted to and practice Buddhism. Mang also worship spirits and village deities like
Pochamma and Maisamma, who according to them are responsible for all the good and bad that befalls the village community. The Mang celebrate all major Hindu festivals, as well as the annual Jatara festival for the deity Maisamma, which entails the sacrifice of sheep and goats and a feast of lamb and goat meat.

Society and culture
Before the British era, Mang were one of the twelve hereditary village servants called Bara Balutedar. The Mang were the hereditary rope makers and village entertainers. For their services they received a share of the village produce. The caste was hindu and observed the Hindu rituals of Jawal (first hair cut), shendi, lagna, and funerary rites.
In the early 20th century, the Mang began to form caste associations to advocate their cause, such as the Mang Samaj (1932) and Mang Society (1923).

Notables
Annabhau Sathe, Maharashtra social reformer
Lahuji Raghoji Salve, Maharashtra social reformer

References

Further reading

Denotified tribes of India
Social groups of Madhya Pradesh
Social groups of Maharashtra
Indian castes
Dalit communities
Musician castes
Scheduled Castes of Maharashtra
Leatherworking castes
Weaving communities of South Asia